The trolley was a platform body with four relatively small wheels mounted underneath it, the front two on a turntable undercarriage. It was drawn by a pair of horses and the driver's seat was mounted on the headboard. 

It had two wrought iron straps passing down the sides and under the bottom, having a sling shackled to holes in the top ends of the straps so that the whole and its contents could be lifted by crane onto the trolley for movement by road, onto a railway truck or into the hold of a ship. It was therefore a logical step on from the pantechnicon van in the development of containerization.

The system thereby provided a means of door-to-door transit and was used particularly for furniture removals. The furniture makers and merchants, Maple and Co., in particular, used it to deliver between their depôts in London and Paris. 

It was also used for the carriage of meat. In this case, the lift van had a double floor, roof and walls with insulating material such as cork and a layer of paper between the cork and each skin.

The earliest note by the Oxford English Dictionary is a reference by The Baltimore Sun in 1955, comparing the advantages of "lift-on, lift-off service involving only a truck van" with those of "roll on-roll off". However, this would appear to relate to the modern form of container while using old terminology.

References
Ingram, A. Horse-Drawn Vehicles Since 1760 (1977) 
Oxford English Dictionary (1987) 
 
Wagons